KVG or kvg may refer to:

 Boazi language (ISO 639-3 language code kvg), a Papuan language spoken in the Western Province of Papua New Guinea
 Kavieng Airport (IATA airport code KVG), an airport in Kavieng, New Ireland, Papua New Guinea
 KVG College of Engineering, one of many engineering colleges in Karnataka, India